Dames of Malta are female members of the Sovereign Military Order of Malta. The male counterparts of these Dames are the Knights of Malta.

Prominent living Dames of Malta include: 
Anne M. Burke
Bernadette Castro
Janne Haaland Matláry
Freda Payne
Sharon Rich
Karen Garver Santorum
Marianna, Dowager Viscountess Monckton of Brenchley, served as High Sheriff of Kent (1981–82); widow of Gilbert Walter Riversdale Monckton, 2nd Viscount Monckton of Brenchley  
Patricia Mary, Lady Talbot of Malahide (née Riddell)
Elisabeth von Thurn und Taxis
Princess Michael of Kent

Deceased Dames of Malta
Lady Jean Bertie (née Crichton-Stuart), mother of Fra' Andrew Willoughby Ninian Bertie, first Grand Master  of the Sovereign Military Order of Malta since 1258 to hail from the English-speaking world 
Emma, Lady Hamilton (1765-1815), awarded the Maltese Cross by Emperor Paul I of Russia for her aid to blockaded Malta. Lady Hamilton was the first English woman to be invested as a Dame of Malta 
Csilla von Boeselager, Hungarian philanthropist; founded the Hungarian Maltese Charity Organisation (Ungarischer Malteser Caritas Dienst) 
Genevieve Garvan Brady, Papal Duchess, Dame of the Order of the Holy Sepulchre, holder of the Cross Pro Ecclesia et Pontifice, founder of  the Carroll Club (“for Catholic business girls”), philanthropist; board chairman Girl Scouts of the USA; vice-president of the Welfare  Council of New York 
Marie Isobel, Countess Cathcart
Mary Higgins Clark 
Virginia A. Dwyer (1921-1997), director and deputy chairman of the Federal Reserve Bank of New York; chairman of the board of trustees of the University of Rochester; and a board member of Eaton Corporation, Schering-Plough, Borden, Southern Company, the Atlantic Companies, and Georgia Power 
Clare Ann Kalkwarf, Vice-President, Brotherhood of Blessed Gérard, the South African Relief Organisation of the Order of Malta; first South African woman to be invested as a Dame of Malta
Clare Boothe Luce, American playwright and political activist 
Dorothea Angela McElduff (1926–2013), Member of Equestrian Order of the Holy Sepulchre and Dame of Malta 
Mary McShain (née Mary J. Horstmann), great-niece of Bishop Ignatius F. Horstmann (the third Bishop of the Diocese of Cleveland); widow of John McShain 
Regina A Quick, American philanthropist 
Phyllis Schlafly, American constitutional lawyer and conservative activist
Lady Hilda Susan Northcote Swan, late wife of Sir Conrad Swan 
Princess Urraca of Bourbon-Two Sicilies 
Princess Maria Ludwiga Theresia of Bavaria

References

 
Lists of Roman Catholics